BatchMaster Software is a software company that develops Enterprise Resource Planning (ERP) solution.

About 
BatchMaster Software develops ERP software for the process manufacturing industry, such as Food & Beverage, Nutraceutical, Chemicals & Coatings, Cosmetics & Personal Care, Pharmaceutical & Life Sciences.

The company is headquartered in Laguna Hills, California, USA and has offices in New York, India, New Zealand and Mexico.

It is a Microsoft Gold Certified Partner and reseller of SAP Business One.

History 
BatchMaster was founded by Randy Peck as Pacific Micro Software Engineering and later changed the name to BatchMaster DOS. The company then started the project to come up with Windows based application software. In 2001, Infocus Solutions Pvt. Ltd. (ISPL) was formed in Indore, India to finish the project. ISPL started its operation with a team of seven people and within four years more than hundred people were working for the organization. The Company formally announced its India operations in 2006 and changed the name to BatchMaster Software Pvt. Ltd.

Products 
BatchMaster ERP is the flagship product of the company and offers integration with:

 SAP Business One
 Microsoft Dynamics GP
 QuickBooks
 Sage 100 and Sage 300

References 

ERP software companies
Software companies based in California
Companies established in 1983
1983 establishments in California
ERP software
Business software
Software companies of the United States
1983 establishments in the United States
Software companies established in 1983